Wake Young Women's Leadership Academy (WYWLA) is a public secondary school for girls in Raleigh, North Carolina. It is a part of Wake County Public School System.

It has grades 6–13, with the Governor Morehead School's campus housing most grades, except the campus of St. Augustine's University  has grades 11 through 13.

History
In 2011 the school system proposed creating single gender schools. Initially they were to be located at William Peace University, but that institution chose not to host them.

WYWLA was established in 2012.

The Governor Morehead campus held all Wake Young Women's students until St. Augustine's formed a partnership in 2013. In 2016 the first class graduated.

In the 2021 U.S. News & World Report 2021 Best High Schools List, WYWLA was ranked #36 in North Carolina and #1,282 in the United States.

Admissions
Each year the school admits 50–60 students in the 6th grade and smaller numbers in other grades.

References

Further reading
  – Discussed in "Wake County's first single-gender public schools hold graduation".

External links
 Wake Young Women's Leadership Academy

Schools in Raleigh, North Carolina
Public high schools in North Carolina
Public middle schools in North Carolina
Public girls' schools in the United States
2012 establishments in North Carolina
Educational institutions established in 2012